South Louisiana ICE Processing Center (previously South Louisiana Correctional Facility) is a privately owned and operated prison facility located on the eastern edge of Basile in Acadia Parish, Louisiana.  The facility was opened in 1993 by the private prison company LCS Corrections Services and is currently owned and operated by The GEO Group, Inc.  It has a capacity of 1,000.

The facility previously housed inmates for Louisiana Department of Public Safety and Corrections, housing both male and females at a mix of minimum, medium, and maximum security, with a capacity of 1,048. In April 2019, GEO announced the signing of a contract modification with the U.S. Immigration and Customs Enforcement for the reactivation of the facility to house male and female ICE detainees awaiting immigration court hearings and deportation.

In July and August 2009, a hundred ICE inmates in Basile staged a series of five hunger strikes to protest substandard conditions and lack of appropriate medical care.

References

Prisons in Louisiana
Buildings and structures in Acadia Parish, Louisiana
Private prisons in the United States
Immigration detention centers and prisons in the United States
1993 establishments in Louisiana